Dmitri Andreyevich Topolev (born 3 July 1976) is a former Russian professional football player.

Club career
He played 2 seasons in the Russian Football National League for FC Spartak-Orekhovo Orekhovo-Zuyevo and FC Shinnik Yaroslavl.

External links
 

1976 births
Living people
Russian footballers
Association football defenders
FC Znamya Truda Orekhovo-Zuyevo players
FC Shinnik Yaroslavl players
FC Vityaz Podolsk players
FC Arsenal Tula players
FC Lukhovitsy players
FC Sheksna Cherepovets players